Jean Starr Untermeyer (March 13, 1886 – July 27, 1970) was an American poet, translator, and educator. She was the author of six volumes of poetry and a memoir. She was married to the poet Louis Untermeyer.

Biography 
Starr was born into a well-off Jewish family in Zanesville, Ohio, the daughter of Abram Starr and Johanna Starr (née Schonfeld), the oldest of three siblings. Her maternal grandparents were immigrants from Germany.

Starr was educated at Kohut College Preparatory School for Girls, in New York City, and then entered Columbia University. While still in college, she met the poet Louis Untermeyer, whom she married, on January 23, 1907, without finishing her degree. In December of the same year the couple's son Richard was born.

Through her marriage Jean Untermeyer came into contact with many poets and, especially inspired by hearing a reading of poems by Edna St. Vincent Millay, she began writing poetry privately. When her husband read her poems he was impressed by them and, on her behalf, submitted them to several magazines that accepted them for publication; with his support, her first book of poems, Growing Pains, was published by B. W. Huebsch in 1918.  Huebsch also published her next book, Dreams Out of Darkness, in 1921.

Early on Untermeyer aspired to be a singer, and in 1924 made her debut in Berlin and Vienna singing Lieder. The performances were not well received, and she did not further pursue a musical career. She had traveled to Europe with her husband, and they then returned to the United States.  They spent the summer of 1925 at the MacDowell artists' colony.

The Untermeyers divorced in 1926. In 1927 their son, Richard, who was 19 years old and in his sophomore year at Yale University, committed suicide in his room at school.

Jean and Louis Untermeyer reconciled several years later and remarried after Louis had been married and divorced a second time.  They adopted two sons; however, they eventually separated again, with Louis agreeing to take custody of their sons, and the marriage ended once and for all in divorce, around 1933.

Jean Starr Untermeyer continued to write poetry, publishing several further collections, including Winged Child (1936). Her poems are often traditional in form, with subtle, intricate harmonies;  drawing inspiration from both nature and domestic life, they explore themes related to self-discipline and loss.

She visited the MacDowell Colony again in 1938. In 1939, during a stay at Yaddo, the writers' and artists' colony in Saratoga Springs, she met the German author Hermann Broch, with whom she struck up a complex collaboration, as she worked on translating Broch's novel Der Tod des Vergil. Her translation, The Death of Virgil, was published in 1945.

Untermeyer later taught at Olivet College, in Michigan, and at the New School for Social Research, in New York City.

Works

Poetry collections
 Growing Pains (1918)
 Dreams Out of Darkness (1921) 
 Steep Ascent (1927) 
 The Winged Child (1936) 
 Love and Need: Collected Poems, 1918–1940 (1940) 
 Later Poems (1958)
 Job's Daughter (1967)

Memoir
 Private Collection (1965)

Translations
 Oscar Bie, Schubert, the Man (1928). Biography; translated from the German
 Hermann Broch, The Death of Virgil (1945). Novel; translated from the German
 Recreations (1970). Translations of poems from the French, German, and Hebrew

References

External links 
Guide to the Papers of Jean Starr Untermeyer, State University of New York at Buffalo
Guide to the Papers of Jean Starr Untermeyer, Yale University

1886 births
1970 deaths
Olivet College faculty
American people of German-Jewish descent
American women poets
Jewish American poets
People from Zanesville, Ohio
20th-century American translators
20th-century American women writers
The New School faculty